Mirza Adil (born 30 March 1943) is a Sudanese weightlifter. He competed in the 1960 Summer Olympics.

References

1943 births
Living people
Weightlifters at the 1960 Summer Olympics
Sudanese male weightlifters
Olympic weightlifters of Sudan
People from Khartoum